The Zakspeed 881 was a Formula One car designed by Chris Murphy and Heinz Zollner and raced by Zakspeed in the 1988 Formula One World Championship. The car was the last to be powered by the team's own 1.5-litre straight-4 turbo engine, the 1500/4. It was driven by Italian veteran Piercarlo Ghinzani and West German rookie Bernd Schneider.

The 881 was a development of the team's  car, the 871, and was a largely unsuccessful car in the last year for turbos in Formula One. Both Ghinzani and Schneider, who replaced 1987 drivers Martin Brundle and Christian Danner, struggled all season to qualify the car even against the slower atmospheric cars. A glaring example of this was at Silverstone for the British Grand Prix. At the fastest circuit on the calendar that should have suited the turbo powered cars, both Ghinzani and Schneider failed to qualify, the Zakspeeds being the only turbo cars not to do so. The 881 was also unreliable, often blowing either the engine or the turbo many times over a race weekend.

While this made the engine one of the most powerful in the field, being only about 10 bhp shy of both the Honda and Ferrari V6 engines, and around the same as the other straight 4 turbo in the field, the Megatrons used by Arrows, that is where the similarities ended. Honda powered McLaren to 15 wins and 15 pole positions during the season, with the other win and pole going to Ferrari. Ghinzani failed to qualify on seven occasions while Schneider failed to qualify ten times. Something that did not help the team's cause was the weight of the car.

Bernd Schneider recorded the team's best finish for the year when he finished 12th in his and the team's home race in Germany at Hockenheim. The German rookie had to wait until Round 4 in Mexico to qualify for his first race. There at the Autodromo Hermanos Rodriguez in the high altitude of Mexico City where the thinner air gave the turbos a massive power advantage over their atmospheric rivals (the 'atmos' lost a reported 25% of their power at altitude while the turbos lost around 5%), Schneider qualified in an encouraging 15th place and ran well early on the edge of the top 10 until retiring with engine failure on lap 16.

The 881's replacement, the Zakspeed 891, would be powered by a Yamaha V8 engine.

Complete Formula One results
(key)

References

Books
 

1988 Formula One season cars
Zakspeed Formula One cars